James Zachariah George (October 20, 1826August 14, 1897) was an American lawyer, writer, U.S. politician, Confederate politician,  and military officer. He was known as Mississippi's "Great Commoner". He was also a slave owner.

Biography
James Z. George was born in Monroe County, Georgia, but moved to Noxubee County, Mississippi at age eight when his widowed mother remarried, and two years later, to Carroll County, Mississippi, where he received his education in the common schools. He served as a private in the Mexican–American War under Colonel Jefferson Davis, and participated in the Battle of Monterey. On his return, George read law and was admitted to the bar. In 1854 he became a reporter of the Supreme Court of Mississippi and, over the next 20 years, George prepared a 10-volume digest of its cases.

As a member of the Mississippi Secession Convention, George signed the Secession Ordinance. A Confederate colonel of the 5th Mississippi Cavalry during the Civil War, he was captured twice and spent two years in a prisoner of war camp, where he conducted a law course for his fellow captives. After the war, he returned to Mississippi and resumed the practice of law. In 1879 he was appointed to the Supreme Court of Mississippi and immediately was chosen chief justice by his colleagues.

From 1881 until his death, George represented Mississippi in the United States Senate, where he was recognized for his skills in debate, helped frame the future Sherman Anti-Trust Act, introduced the bill for agricultural college experiment stations, and encouraged the establishment of the Department of Agriculture. Alarmed by the proposed Lodge Bill, which would have provided for federal supervision of elections, he campaigned in Mississippi for a constitutional convention in order to legally disenfranchise African-Americans, without resorting to violence, fraud, and other extralegal measures that had been used prior.  He was a major figure during the Mississippi Constitutional Convention of 1890 itself, leading a hardline faction promoting the disenfranchisement of blacks without disenfranchising whites (as opposed to those who wanted to apply property and educational requirements to whites and blacks equally), and successfully defended the constitution before the Senate and the Supreme Court.

George died in Mississippi City, Mississippi, where he had gone for health treatment. He is buried, along with his wife, Elizabeth Brooks (Young) George, in Evergreen Cemetery in North Carrollton, Mississippi. George's wife Elizabeth was the granddaughter of Col. William Martin Jr. of Tennessee, and the great-granddaughter of General Joseph Martin, an early Virginia explorer and Revolutionary War commander.

In 1931, the state of Mississippi donated a bronze statue of George to the United States Capitol's National Statuary Hall Collection.

In addition, George County, Mississippi, is also named in his honor.

See also
Battle of Collierville – Col. J. Z. George captured.
List of United States Congress members who died in office (1790–1899)

References

Further reading
 Timothy B. Smith. James Z. George: Mississippi's Great Commoner  (University Press of Mississippi; 2012) 256 pages; scholarly biography

External links
 On-line biography

1826 births
1897 deaths
People of Mississippi in the American Civil War
People from Monroe County, Georgia
Mississippi Democrats
Democratic Party United States senators from Mississippi
Chief Justices of the Mississippi Supreme Court
19th-century American politicians
People from Carroll County, Mississippi
19th-century American lawyers
19th-century American judges
American military personnel of the Mexican–American War
U.S. state supreme court judges admitted to the practice of law by reading law
People from Noxubee County, Mississippi
American slave owners
United States senators who owned slaves